Heart of the Forest is a 1979 Spanish film directed by Manuel Gutiérrez Aragón. It was entered into the 29th Berlin International Film Festival.

Cast
 Norman Briski as Juan
 Ángela Molina as Amparo
 Luis Politti as El Andarín
 Víctor Valverde as Suso

References

External links
 

1979 films
Spanish drama films
1970s Spanish-language films
Films directed by Manuel Gutiérrez Aragón
Films about the Spanish Maquis
1970s Spanish films